BUTT is a biannual magazine that features photography and interviews about alternative gay and queer culture and sexuality. Historically, the magazine has been marketed as for gay men. BUTT was founded in 2001 by Gert Jonkers and Jop van Bennekom. The magazine, originating in the Netherlands, features interviews, articles, and advertisements and illuminated upon trends and lifestyles within the homosexual and queer community.

The magazine publishes interviews and photographs with gay, lesbian, transgender, and queer artists. Its first issue showed German fashion designer Bernhard Willhelm in nude portraits taken by Wolfgang Tillmans. Since its first issue in May 2001, BUTT has featured artists such as Casey Spooner, Michael Stipe, John Waters, Arca, Heinz Peter Knes, Leilah Weinraub, Edmund White, Terence Koh, Walter Pfeiffer, Hilton Als, and Slava Mogutin. Readers submitted interviews, letters, photographs, or articles. Subscribers were referred to as "Buttheads" and could join the Butthead community officially through the magazine's website.

In 2005, The Guardian named BUTT as one of its top twenty magazines. , it had an estimated worldwide circulation of 24,000. In 2014, Taschen released Butt Forever, an anthology of some of the magazine's highlights since its inception.

The magazine is available worldwide. In the United States and the United Kingdom, it was available at American Apparel stores, among other places. It ceased print publication in 2011, and relaunched in September of 2022.

BUTT has been praised for its unabashed sexual and non-sexual portrayals of men, which emphasize equal opportunity in depictions of all people in print. The magazine has been lauded for its unique, candid approach to interviews, which may be done by anyone.

References

External links 
 

Gay men's magazines
LGBT-related magazines published in the Netherlands
Magazines established in 2001
Quarterly magazines published in the Netherlands